Jorge Labarga (born 1952) is a justice of the Florida Supreme Court, taking office on January 6, 2009. On June 30, 2014, he was sworn in as Florida's 56th Chief Justice and the first Cuban-American to hold the post. He was succeeded on July 1, 2018, by Charles T. Canady.

Biography 

Labarga was born in Havana, Cuba in 1952 to Miriam and Jorge Labarga, Sr. He grew up and graduated high school in Pahokee, Florida the heavily agricultural Lake Okeechobee region of western Palm Beach County. He graduated from Forest Hill High School, West Palm Beach in 1972 and received his Bachelor of Arts from the University of Florida, Gainesville in 1976. He received his Juris Doctor from University of Florida School of Law in 1979. After law school he became an assistant public defender. In 1982, he joined the state attorney's office. From 1987 to 1992, he joined the law firm of Cone, Wagner, Nugent, Roth, Romano & Ericksen, P.A. In 1992, he was a founding partner with  the law firm of Roth, Duncan & Labarga, P.A. In 1996, Governor Lawton Chiles appointed him a circuit court judge.

Judicial career

From 1996 to 2009, he served as a judge for the 15th Circuit Court in Palm Beach County, Florida. He is notable as the non-partisan judge who refused a new county-only vote during the 2000 U.S. Presidential election on the grounds that the Constitution stated that an election must be held everywhere in the United States on the same day, not just in one area.

Prior to his Florida Supreme Court appointment, Labarga had been appointed by Governor Charlie Crist to the Fourth District Court of Appeal for Florida, an intermediate appellate court based in West Palm Beach, Florida.  He served in that position only a single day, January 5, 2009. His term on that court was cut short when Governor Crist quickly elevated Labarga to the Florida Supreme Court to replace retiring Justice Harry Lee Anstead. On June 30, 2014, Labarga was sworn in as the 56th Chief Justice of the Supreme Court of Florida, replacing former Chief Justice Ricky Polston. Labarga is the first person of Hispanic descent to lead the state of Florida's judicial branch.

Personal life 

Labarga is married to Zulma R. Labarga, and they have two daughters.

See also
List of Hispanic/Latino American jurists

References

External links
Bio on Florida Supreme Court Website

|-

1952 births
Living people
21st-century American judges
American judges of Cuban descent
American politicians of Cuban descent
Chief Justices of the Florida Supreme Court
Cuban emigrants to the United States
Forest Hill Community High School alumni
Fredric G. Levin College of Law alumni
Hispanic and Latino American judges
Justices of the Florida Supreme Court
People from Havana
People from Pahokee, Florida
Public defenders
University of Florida alumni